Matt's Wild Cherry is a cultivar of tomato ostensibly based on the original wild tomato plants, acquired by a friend of Doctor Matt Liebman in Hidalgo, Mexico. Liebman raised this cultivar in Maine, eventually releasing it under his own name. It is species Lycopersicum esculentum var. cerasiforme.

See also

 List of tomato cultivars

References

Tomato cultivars